The River Slea is a tributary of the south branch of the River Wey in Hampshire.

Course
The river flows east from the confluence of the Kingsley and the longer Oakhanger streams at Kingsley Mill, through the village of Sleaford until it meets the Wey just north of Brockford Bridge. The section between Kingsley Mill and Sleaford is also known as the Oxney Stream.

The Slea's main tributary is the Oxney Moss which rises on the west side of Bordon and joins at Sleaford.

Water quality
The Environment Agency measure water quality of the river systems in England. Each is given an overall ecological status, which may be one of five levels: high, good, moderate, poor and bad. There are several components that are used to determine this, including biological status, which looks at the quantity and varieties of invertebrates, angiosperms and fish. Chemical status, which compares the concentrations of various chemicals against known safe concentrations, is rated good or fail.

Water quality of the River Slea in 2019:

References

Slea
Wey catchment